Mario Dajsinani (born 23 December 1998) is an Albanian professional footballer who plays as a goalkeeper for Albanian club Laci and the Albania national football team.

Club career

Early career
Dajsinani made his professional debut for hometown club Besa Kavajë during the 2014–15 season at just the age of 16. He played his first match as a professional on 6 December 2014 in a away match against Veleçiku Koplik, keeping a clean sheet. During this season, he played 17 league matches and slowly developed as a talent within Besa's youth system and was later added to the roster of the U-17 national team. He kept his spot even for the 2015–16 season where he made 13 appearances in the first part of the season before leaving the team in January.

Partizani Tirana
On 21 January 2016, Dajsinani signed a three-year contract with Partizani Tirana as the team's third choice keeper.

Skënderbeu Korçë
On 19 June 2017, Dajsinani suddenly joined Skënderbeu Korçë and was included in team's UEFA Europa League squad. His transfer was made official two days later where he signed a four-year contract, his first as a professional. He made his league debut for the club on 19 May 2018 in a 3-1 away loss to Luftëtari Gjirokastër. He was subbed on in the 55th minute for Aldo Teqja.

International career
Dajsinani received his first international level call up at Albania national under-19 football team by coach Arjan Bellaj for a 7 days gathering in Durrës, Albania from 29 August to 5 September 2015.

He was called up to participate in the 2016 UEFA European Under-19 Championship qualification from 12–17 November 2015. However, he was considered as a third choice behind Elhan Kastrati & Gentian Selmani and therefore wasn't included in the 18-man squad which participated in the Group 1 matches.

He then received a call up to the Albania under-19 by same coach Arjan Bellaj for the friendly tournament Roma Caput Mundi from 29 February–4 March 2016.

Dajsinani was called up at Albania national under-21 football team by coach Alban Bushi for a gathering in Durrës, Albania from 18–25 January 2017.

He received his first call up for the Albania under-20 side by same coach of the under-21 team Alban Bushi for the friendly match against Georgia U20 on 14 November 2017. He debuted for under-20 team against Georgia by playing as a starter for 75 minutes in a 3–0 loss, where all 3 goals were conceded with him at goalie.

Career statistics

Club

References

External links
 Mario Dajsinani profile FSHF.org
 
 

1998 births
Living people
Footballers from Durrës
Albanian footballers
Association football goalkeepers
Albania youth international footballers
Albania under-21 international footballers
Kategoria e Parë players
Besa Kavajë players
FK Partizani Tirana players
KF Skënderbeu Korçë players
KF Erzeni players